The Mérida Marathon (also known as the Maraton de Ciudad de Mérida or Maratón Mérida Banorte) is a 26.2-mile footrace along the streets of Mérida, Mexico. It was first run in 1986. The run celebrates the founding of the city. In 2020, 4,000 runners participated in the event. The race travels through the heart of "The White City," the capital of the Mexican state of Yucatan. The course travels on the Paseo de Montejo past monuments and churches that date back to the 1500s.

History
The marathons of 1986 and 1987 were sponsored by the company Mericolor. In 1992, two competing marathons were held in the city: The 450th Anniversary Marathon of the Mérida Foundation and the VII Mérida City Marathon. In 1994, 1996, 1997 and 1998, no marathons were held in the city of Mérida. The 2021 running was offered as a "virtual" race.

The race is not associated with the Rock and Roll Merida Half Marathon that was previously run in September.

Race Weekend
The race weekend includes the marathon, a half marathon, a 10K run and a 3K walk. A wheelchair category is also included.

Winners

External Links
AIMS Profile
Official Website

References

Marathons in Mexico
Marathons in North America
Athletics competitions in Mexico